Peinaleopolynoe orphanae (elvis worm) is a species of Polynoidae discovered by Hatch, Liew, Hourdez & Rouse, 2020. The specimen was discovered alongside several others of the same genus (Peinaleopolynoe). It was named for geobiologist Victoria Orphan.

References 

Phyllodocida
Animals described in 2020